The Conservatory and Botanical Garden of the city of Geneva is a museum and an institution of the City of Geneva.

Establishment and location
It was founded in 1817 in a former area of Bastions Park in 1817 by Augustin Pyramus de Candolle. The Botanical Gardens were transferred to the Console site (192 rue de Lausanne) in 1904, constructed by the Genevan architect Henri Juvet in 1902–1904 specifically to house the Delessert herbarium held at Bastions. The collection grew in 1911–1912 with the gift of the Emile Burant herbarium, then again in 1923–1924 with the posthumous donation of the de Candolle herbarium. In its present location, it occupies an area of  adjacent to Lake Geneva and the park of the United Nations Office at Geneva and ranks as one of the five most important in the world. The Botanical Garden's greenhouses initially remained at the Bastions site for financial reasons. Then, in 1910–1911, the architect Henri Juvet built a Winter Garden along the former Chemin de Varembe, which was moved to its present location close to the railway lines following the construction of the Palais des Nations and the various associated urban redevelopments that took place. The elegant glass and iron structure is in line with constructions of this type in fashion in the second half of the 19th century. It originally comprised two adjacent but separate sections: the Winter Garden and a greenhouse, creating an asymmetrical effect. A symmetrical wing was added to the first in 1935. The greenhouses at Bastions were removed to make way for the Wall of the Reformers.

Collections
The botanical garden includes a living collection of 14,000 species of 249 different families from around the world, and a historical herbarium of nearly 6 million botanical specimens. The library of over 220,000 volumes.

The living collection is divided into several sections: an arboretum, rock gardens and banks of protected plants, medicinal and useful plants, greenhouses, horticultural plants (including a "garden of scent and touch"). The garden also incorporates a zoo dedicated to conservation and the Botanicum (a family space) near the lake.

The Index Herbariorum code assigned to the herbarium of this botanic garden is G and it is used when citing housed specimens.

The botanical garden produces Candollea, (Organe du Conservatoire et du Jardin Botaniques de la Ville de Genève). An international peer-reviewed journal that publishes original scientific papers, preferably in English but also in French. Published since 1922, yearly since 1924. It is named after Augustin Pyramus de Candolle founder of the garden.

National classification
The entire garden, including greenhouses, libraries and collections, and two mansions "Le Chene" and "La Console", is registered as a cultural asset of national importance.

Activities
The institution has a special interest in the medicinal plants of Paraguay, with about 5000 known plants thanks to the legacy of the Guaraní people, preserved by the Jesuit missions and the collections of Emil Hassler. The Paraguayan Ethnobotany Project was established in the mid-1990s in collaboration with the Botanical Garden and Zoo of Asunción.

Organic status
From 1 January 2015, under leadership of head gardener Nicolas Freyre and Director Pierre-André Loizeau, the Conservatory and Botanical Gardens became 100% organic, the first public garden in Switzerland to formally meet the standards of Bio Suisse. Although previously almost entirely organic, a bachelor student from the Haute École du paysage, d'ingénierie et d'architecture de Genève validated the requirements. In 2017 the garden will be able to display the Bio Suisse 'Bud' certification label on completion of the required qualification period.

References

External links 

 
 

Geneva
Geneva
Museums in Geneva
Geneva
Museums established in 1817
1817 establishments in Switzerland
Cultural property of national significance in the canton of Geneva
Education in Geneva
Tourist attractions in Geneva